The 14 Amazons is a 1972 Hong Kong wuxia film directed by Cheng Kang and produced by the Shaw Brothers Studio. The award winning film featured a predominantly female cast. The story is about the female generals of the Yang Family.

Overview 
Its alternative title is The Fourteen Amazons. It is also known as Les 14 Amazones, in French. The film is a historical drama martial arts film that sets in the Sing dynasty.

Plot
The Yang family, men and women, had served their country (Song Dynasty) loyally for generations. During the war with Western Xia, General Yang Tsung-pao is ambushed and killed. His death leaves his only son, Yang Wen as the only male heir left to the Yang family. His widow, Mu Kuei-ying, the grand matriarch and the entire family set out to avenge his death and defend the country. Due to the interference of a corrupt official, Wang Ching, the Yangs were unable to have the emperor's consent to use the imperial army.

Thus, they set off with whatever volunteer troops they could muster. Knowing of Mu Kuei-ying's reputation as a warrior and tactician, the king of West Hsia and his sons try various ways to stop her to no avail. They are outsmarted at the end as Mu Kuei-ying, the Yang family and Sung soldiers successfully storm their stronghold.

Cast
 Ivy Ling Po as Mu Guiying
 Lily Ho as Yang Wenguang
 Lisa Lu as She Saihua
Yueh Hua as Lü Chao
Chen Yen-yen as Geng Jinhua
Lin Ching as Zou Lanying
Hsia Ping as Dong Yue'e
Betty Ting as Huang Qiongnü
Huang Chin-feng as Ma Saiying
Ouyang Sha-fei as Chai Meirong
Tina Chin Fei as Du Jin'e
Lee Ching as "8th sister" Yang Yanqi
Yeh Ling-chih as "9th sister" Yang Yanying
Wang Ping as Yang Qiuju
Liu Wu-chih as Yang Qiulan
Shu Pei-pei as Yang Paifeng
Ku Wen-tsung as Yang Hong
Fan Mei-sheng as Jiao Tinggui
Huang Chun-hsing as Meng Huaiyuan
Tien Feng as Wang Wen
Wang Hsieh as Wang Wen's 1st son
Nam Seok-hun as Wang Wen's 2nd son
Tien Ching as Wang Wen's 3rd son
Chin Pei as Wang Wen's 4th son
Lo Lieh as Wang Wen's 5th son
Tsung Hua as Yang Zongbao
Yang Chih-ching as Kou Zhun
Ching Miao as Wang Qin
Yang Ai-hua as Pearl
Ting Chien as Shen Gu
Eric Zeng Zhiwei as Soldier
 Michelle Yim - Yang female soldier

Awards 
 1973 Best Feature Film - Runner Up. 11th Golden Horse Awards.
 1973 Cheng Kang won Best Director. 11th Golden Horse Awards.
 1973 Lisa Lu won Best Supporting Actress. 11th Golden Horse Awards.
 1973 Wang Yung-hua won Best Sound Effects. 11th Golden Horse Awards.
 1973 Lily Ho won Outstanding Female Lead Performance. 19th Asian Film Festival.

References

External links
 
 
 The 14 Amazons at Hong Kong Cinemagic

1972 films
Shaw Brothers Studio films
Wuxia films
1970s action war films
Funimation
Films set in 11th-century Song dynasty
Films set in the Western Xia
Works based on The Generals of the Yang Family
Hong Kong action war films
Films about widowhood
1970s Mandarin-language films
1970s Hong Kong films